Oualid Mokhtari (born 29 April 1982) is a Moroccan former professional footballer who played as a midfielder. He also holds German citizenship. He is the brother of Youssef Mokhtari.

References

External links
 
 

1982 births
Living people
People from Nador
Moroccan footballers
Association football midfielders
SSV Jahn Regensburg players
SV Wehen Wiesbaden players
Kickers Offenbach players
Eintracht Frankfurt players
FSV Frankfurt players
VfR Mannheim players
VfB Lübeck players
2. Bundesliga players
Riffian people